Laotong is a type of relationship in Chinese culture formerly practised in Hunan that bonded two girls together for eternity as kindred sisters.

There two cultural practises in Hunan in past centuries, Laotong and Laotang, acknowledged women's social bonds.

Chinese women commonly refer to each other as "Sisters". This is a recognition of the importance of women's supportive relationships, which help them endure hardships over their lives. Preparation for marriage might involve a Laotang relationship between several young women; the sisterhood would be dissolved upon marriage. After marriage, new sisterhoods could be formed later between married or widowed women.

For Chinese women, the Laotong or "old-sames" relationship was the strongest and most precious bond of female friendship. This was a more rare and formal relationship between women. A woman could only have one Laotong, and the intensely unbreakable bond was for life. 

Often a Laotong relationship would be formed when a marriage was contracted between families who were expecting babies. This was done before the babies were born. If both children turned out female against the hopes of their families, the daughters could be brought together as Laotong. An intermediary, in some places a matchmaker, would form a Laotong relationship between two girls, similar to an arranged marriage. The Chinese astrological profiles of the girls were considered during the matching process. It was unusual for a Laotong relationship to be broken.

The relationship was made formal by the signing of a contract, which would be done much like a legal contract, using a seal. Laotong would frequently develop a language to use to communicate between them that only they could understand (a type of Nu shu), allowing them to send messages back and forth to one another. 

These elements of the Laotong practise are shown in Lisa See's novel Snow Flower and the Secret Fan, which was made into a 2011 movie directed by Wayne Wang.

See also 

 Nu shu
 Women in ancient China
 Hunan
 Chinese social relations
 Women's history
 Snow Flower and the Secret Fan

References 

Chinese culture
Culture in Hunan
Social history of China
Chinese literature
Women in China